Minawar is a village located  from the city of Gilgit in the northern area of Pakistan, in the Kashmir region.  The population of the village is about 300 families.  In Minawar there are a middle school and a high school for about 500 students.

Geography and climate
The village is on the Karakoram Highway, the main road for expeditions to Karakoram.

The surrounding mountains create sharp variations in weather, and the temperatures can sometimes be very hot in the summer during the day, but are always cold at night.

References

External links
Map of Minawar

Populated places in Gilgit District